John Gordon Hannigan (January 19, 1929 – November 16, 1966) was a Canadian professional ice hockey forward who played for the Toronto Maple Leafs in the National Hockey League between 1952 and 1956.

Playing career
Hannigan was a left winger and centre for the Toronto Maple Leafs (1952–1956) of the National Hockey League (NHL), Pittsburgh Hornets (1951–1952, 1954–1956) and Rochester Americans (1956–1957) of the American Hockey League (AHL) and the Edmonton Flyers (1957–1958) of the Western Hockey League (WHL).

He played for the St. Michael's College School Monarchs as a 155-pound, fast-skating left winger, in 1951. He worked out with Toronto for the first time in February 1949, along with Tim Horton. Because of an Ontario Hockey Association rule, the two college players were not allowed to play for the Toronto Marlborosa Maple Leafs affiliatein that junior ice hockey league. Leafs' President Conn Smythe did not like the ruling but granted the junior players a trial after four of his team's forwards were injured. In October 1953 Hannigan sustained a rib injury in practice and was out of the Maple Leafs lineup for three weeks.

Hannigan played the 1956–57 season for the Rochester Americans of the American Hockey League. Jack Perrin, President of the WHL Winnipeg Warriors (1955–1961), made overtures to buy Hannigan's rights from the Maple Leafs in September 1957. Hannigan told Perrin that, if he could not play for the NHL Leafs, he would only consider an offer from the WHL Edmonton Flyers. He was purchased by the Flyers from the Leafs in October 1957, and his first game for the Flyers was against the Saskatoon/St. Paul Regals, when he replaced injured rookie John Utendale.

His older brother, Ray Hannigan, played in the NHL, AHL and WHL (1948–1955). His younger brother, Pat Hannigan, played in the WHL and NHL (1956–1962). The three brothers played with, or against, each other in some of those seasons.

Personal life
Gord Hannigan was a partner, with his brothers, in a successful Edmonton ice cream business at the time of his acquisition by the Flyers. He also had other interests in the Alberta city.

Hannigan married Ann Mary Conboy of Pittsburgh, Pennsylvania in August 1953. Together they had nine children, before the then 37-year-old's sudden hospitalization and death in Edmonton on November 16, 1966.

Career statistics

Regular season and playoffs

See also
 List of family relations in the National Hockey League

References

External links
 

1929 births
1966 deaths
Canadian emigrants to the United States
Canadian ice hockey centres
Edmonton Flyers (WHL) players
Ice hockey people from Ontario
Ontario Hockey Association Senior A League (1890–1979) players
Pittsburgh Hornets players
Rochester Americans players
Sportspeople from Timmins
Toronto Maple Leafs players
Toronto Marlboros players
Toronto St. Michael's Majors players